Stars on Sunday was a religious request programme produced by Yorkshire Television (YTV) and broadcast on the ITV network between 1969 and 1979. It aired on Sunday early evenings during what was known colloquially as "The God Slot", the time in television schedules set aside for religious broadcasting.

Origin
Yorkshire Television executive and producer Jess Yates developed Stars on Sunday as a replacement for outgoing show, Choirs on Sunday. The new format was a religious variety show with sets of a house and grounds created in the YTV studios in Leeds. One backdrop was the towering west front of the house; other scenes took place in the grounds, a waterfall and lake, the rose garden, the hall of dreams, a ruined abbey and a paddock. The most substantial set was the Lady Chapel constructed around genuine stained glass windows recovered from St John's Church, Bury, during demolition. Originally the windows had been exhibited at The Great Exhibition of 1851 in Hyde Park, London. When hosting the show Yates would be seated at an organ in front of the window. He gained the nickname "The Bishop" for his solemn delivery style.

Viewers wrote in to request hymns or Bible readings and these were performed by a series of guest celebrities.

Success and popularity
A key element to the early success of the programme was Yates's ability to persuade UK and international celebrities to appear in the religious show for a small fraction of their normal fee. They were paid the minimum Equity fee of £49.
   
The programme was reported to have increased its viewing figures from 600,000 to around seven million at the peak of its success, although other reports cite regular audiences of more than 15 million.

Yates's contract with YTV was terminated in 1974 when it was revealed that he had been having an affair with young actress Anita Kay. He was separated from his wife at the time. The programme continued for another five years.

While a "significant" proportion of the inserts recorded for the programme survive, only a handful of complete editions are known to still exist.

Guests
Guest hosts and contributors included:

 Moira Anderson
 Archbishop of Canterbury
 Archbishop of York
 Janet Baker
 Shirley Bassey
 Peter Sellers
 The Beverley Sisters
 Raymond Burr
 Patricia Cahill
 Violet Carson
 Bing Crosby
 Ken Dodd
 Doncaster Wheatsheaf Girls Choir
 Gracie Fields
 Maggie Fitzgibbon
 John Gielgud
 Gerald Harper
 Anita Harris
 Edward Heath
 Howard Keel
 Princess Grace of Monaco
 Eartha Kitt
 Christopher Lee
 James Mason
 Raymond Massey
 Johnny Mathis
 Keith Michell
 Matt Monro
 Earl Mountbatten of Burma
 Anna Neagle
 Roy Orbison
 Gene Pitney
 Cliff Richard
 Ralph Richardson
 Diana Rigg
 Harry Secombe
 Sandie Shaw
 Bill Simpson
 Dorothy Squires
 Kiri Te Kanawa
 Lovelace Watkins
 Norman Wisdom

References

External links

1969 British television series debuts
1979 British television series endings
1960s British television series
1970s British television series
Television series about Christianity
Christian mass media in the United Kingdom
British religious television series
Television series by Yorkshire Television
Television series by ITV Studios
English-language television shows